An underframe is a framework of wood or metal carrying the main body structure of a railway vehicle, such as a locomotive, carriage or wagon.

See also 
 Chassis
 Headstock
 Locomotive bed
 Locomotive frame
 Undercarriage

References 

Locomotive parts